"Gloria" is Japanese pop rock singer-songwriter Yui's fifteenth single. "Gloria" was released on January 20, 2010, by her label Studioseven Recordings and was released in two formats: CD and CD+DVD. The single debuted atop the Oricon Weekly Single Chart becoming her sixth number-one single.

Track list
Normal Edition

Limited Edition
Normal Edition + DVD

Chart performance
"Gloria" debuted at number-one on the Oricon weekly chart and became the artist's sixth number-one single.

Charts

Sales and certifications

References

2010 singles
Yui (singer) songs
Oricon Weekly number-one singles
Songs written by Yui (singer)
Billboard Japan Hot 100 number-one singles
2010 songs